Yael Damaris Oviedo (born 22 May 1992) is an Argentine former footballer who played as a forward and represented the Argentina women's national team. Her last club was Universidad de Chile.

International career
Oviedo represented Argentina at the 2012 FIFA U-20 Women's World Cup.

International goals
Scores and results list Argentina's goal tally first

Honors and awards

Clubs
Boca Juniors
Torneo Apertura: 2011, 2012
Torneo Clausura: 2013
Torneo Inicial: 2013–14
UAI Urquiza
Torneo Femenino: 2016
Universidad de Chile
Femenino Caja Los Andes: 2021

National team
Argentina
South American Games: 2014

Activism
Oviedo supports abortion being legal, safe and free in Argentina.

Retirement 
Oviedo announced her retirement from professional football on 18 Feb, 2022 through her social media.

References

External links
Yael Oviedo at aupaAthletic.com 

1992 births
Living people
People from Concordia, Entre Ríos
Sportspeople from Entre Ríos Province
Argentine women's footballers
Women's association football forwards
Boca Juniors (women) footballers
UAI Urquiza (women) players
Granada CF (women) players
Rayo Vallecano Femenino players
Primera División (women) players
Argentina women's international footballers
2019 FIFA Women's World Cup players
Pan American Games silver medalists for Argentina
Pan American Games medalists in football
Footballers at the 2015 Pan American Games
Footballers at the 2019 Pan American Games
Medalists at the 2019 Pan American Games
South American Games gold medalists for Argentina
South American Games medalists in football
Competitors at the 2014 South American Games
Argentine expatriate women's footballers
Argentine expatriate sportspeople in Brazil
Expatriate women's footballers in Brazil
Argentine expatriate sportspeople in Spain
Expatriate women's footballers in Spain
Argentine expatriate sportspeople in Chile
Expatriate women's footballers in Chile
Argentine abortion-rights activists